The Hard Times Plantation is located in Tensas Parish, Louisiana and was used as a staging area by the Union Army in the Vicksburg Campaign.

See also
Winter Quarters State Historic Site

References

External links
Hard Times Plantation, National Park Service website

Louisiana in the American Civil War